"On the Beach" is a song by British singer-songwriter Chris Rea that was released in 1986 as the second single from his eighth studio album, On the Beach. It was written by Rea and produced by Rea and David Richards. "On the Beach" reached No. 57 in the United Kingdom in 1986 and also charted in France and the Netherlands.

In 1988, Rea re-recorded "On the Beach" for his album New Light Through Old Windows and released it as a single. Produced by Rea and Jon Kelly, it reached No. 12 in the UK and No. 18 in Ireland. In 1989, it reached No. 9 on the US Billboard Adult Contemporary chart.

Background
"On the Beach" was inspired by the Spanish island Formentera off the coast of Ibiza. Speaking to Songfacts, Rea said, "That's where me and my wife became me and my wife. That's what it's about. Yeah, I was 'between the eyes of love.' It's a lovely island if ever you're in Europe."

Critical reception
In a retrospective review of the On the Beach album, Rob Caldwell of AllMusic described the song as the "standout track", adding that the original version was "the most evocative, a little slower and more meditative than [the] others." He recommended the song further by selecting it as an AMG Pick Track. Mike DeGagne, in an AllMusic review of New Light Through Old Windows commented that the song, along with "Let's Dance", "represent a lean toward a more commercial sound."

Track listing

Original release
7-inch single
 "On the Beach (Special Remix)" – 4:20
 "If Anybody Asks You" – 5:00

7-inch single (alternative release)
 "On the Beach" – 5:03
 "On the Beach (Special Remix)" – 4:20

2x 7-inch single (UK limited edition release)
 "On the Beach (Special Remix)" – 4:20
 "If Anybody Asks You" – 5:00
 "Chris Rea Live" – 3:37 Live at the Hammersmith Odeon - London 2 May 1986
 "Chris Rea Live" – 4:31 Live at the Hammersmith Odeon - London 2 May 1986

7-inch single (US release)
 "On the Beach (Edit)" – 3:47
 "Se Sequi" – 5:03

7-inch single (US promo)
 "On the Beach (Edit)" – 3:47
 "On the Beach (Edit)" – 3:47

12-inch single
 "On the Beach (Special Extended Remix)" – 6:02
 "If Anybody Asks You" – 5:00
 "On the Beach (Special Remix)" – 4:20

12-inch single (Italian promo)
 "On the Beach (Special Remix)" – 4:20
 "If Anybody Asks You" – 5:00
 "One Golden Rule" – 4:45
 "Midnight Blue" – 6:28

1988 release
7-inch single
 "On the Beach Summer '88" – 3:45
 "I'm Taking the Day Out" – 3:25

12-inch single
 "On the Beach Summer '88" – 6:50
 "I'm Taking the Day Out" – 3:25
 "It's All Gone (Live in Montreux)" – 8:10

CD single
 "On the Beach Summer '88" – 3:44
 "I'm Taking the Day Out" – 3:23
 "It's All Gone (Live in Montreux)" – 8:11
 "September Blue" – 3:06

CD single (US promo)
 "On the Beach (Edit)" – 3:47
 "On the Beach (LP Version)" – 6:50

Personnel

1986 version
 Chris Rea - vocals, instruments, producer
 David Richards - producer, mixing on "On the Beach"
 David Scavenger - mixing on "If Anybody Asks You"
 Ekkeheart Gurlitt - photography

1988 version
 Chris Rea - vocals, instruments, producer
 Jon Kelly - producer, engineer
 Justin Shirley-Smith - assistant engineer

Charts

1986 release

1988 release

York version

In 1999, German dance music group York sampled the guitar riff for their track "O.T.B. (On the Beach)". In June 2000, it debuted and peaked at No. 4 on the UK Singles Chart and sold over 200,000 copies to earn a Silver certification from the British Phonographic Industry. Rea himself played guitar with them for their performance of the track on Top of the Pops. Rea also stated on British radio that he had intended to go to Ibiza with York for live promotions but was unable due to a recent heart attack.

Track listings
German maxi-CD single
 "O.T.B. (On the Beach)" (Vocal Radio Mix) – 3:36
 "O.T.B. (On the Beach)" (Magic Marc's Radiomix) – 3:41
 "O.T.B. (On the Beach)" (Milk & Sugar Radio Version) – 3:40
 "O.T.B. (On the Beach)" (Hitch Hiker & Dumondt Radio Version) – 3:30
 "O.T.B. (On the Beach)" (Eivissa@night.mix) – 6:36
 "O.T.B. (On the Beach)" (Milk & Sugar's "Munich Is Burning" Club Mix) – 8:07
 "O.T.B. (On the Beach)" (Hitch Hiker & Dumondt Club Mix) – 8:10

Italian CD single
 "O.T.B. (On the Beach)" (Basic Connection Edit) – 3:18
 "O.T.B. (On the Beach)" (Basic Connection Mix) – 6:40
 "O.T.B. (On the Beach)" (Hitch Hiker & Dumondt Club Mix) – 8:10
 "O.T.B. (On the Beach)" (Eivissa@Night.Mix) – 6:33

Belgian 12-inch single
A1. "O.T.B. (On the Beach)" (Milk & Sugar Club Mix) – 8:07
A2. "O.T.B. (On the Beach)" (CRW Mix) – 6:52
B1. "O.T.B. (On the Beach)" (Original Mix) – 7:13
B2. "O.T.B. (On the Beach)" (Hitch Hiker & Dumondt Club Mix) – 8:10

US 12-inch single
A1. "O.T.B. (On the Beach)" (CRW Mix) – 6:40
A2. "O.T.B. (On the Beach)" – 8:07
B1. "O.T.B. (On the Beach)" (Eivissa@Night Mix) – 6:36
B2. "O.T.B. (On the Beach)" (Hitch Hiker & Dumondt Club Mix) – 8:10

Charts

Weekly charts

Year-end charts

Certifications

Release history

References

1986 songs
1986 singles
1988 singles
1999 singles
Chris Rea songs
Magnet Records singles
Songs about beaches
Songs written by Chris Rea
Warner Records singles